Yopi may refer to:

 Yopi (Zapotec god), a Zapotec divinity, generally identified with Xipe Totec of the Aztecs
 Tlapanec people, known to the Aztecs as Yopi
 Tlapanec language

See also 
 Yopy, a brand of personal digital assistants